The third seeds Jack Crawford and Gar Moon defeated fourth-seeded Harry Hopman and Gerald Patterson 4–6, 6–4, 12–10, 6–3 in the final, to win the men's doubles tennis title at the 1932 Australian Championships.

With the final shot of the match he put away, Crawford completed his Triple Crown, having won Men's Singles and Mixed Doubles titles earlier that day.

Seeds

  Charles Donohoe /  Ray Dunlop (semifinals)
  Ryosuke Nunoi /  Jiro Sato (quarterfinals)
  Jack Crawford /  Gar Moon (champions)
  Harry Hopman /  Gerald Patterson (final)

Draw

Draw

Notes

References

External links
  Source for seedings
  Source for the draw.

1932 in Australian tennis
Men's Doubles